Elections to Epping Forest Council were held on 4 May 2000.  One third of the council was up for election and the council stayed under no overall control. Overall turnout was 30.4%. This was the last election with some of the current boundaries.

By-elections

Grange Hill by-election

Debden Green by-election

Results

Broadway

Buckhurst Hill East

Buckhurst Hill West

Debden Green

Epping Hemnall

Epping Lindsey

Grange Hill

High Ongar

Loughton Forest

Loughton Roding

Loughton St. John's

Loughton St. Mary's

Passingford

Roothing Country

Roydon

Sheering

Theydon Bois

Waltham Abbey East

Waltham Abbey Paternoster

References
2000 Epping Forest election result
Ward results

2000
2000 English local elections
2000s in Essex